Kirill Pankov is a visually impaired Uzbekistani Paralympic swimmer. He represented Uzbekistan at the 2012 Summer Paralympics and at the 2016 Summer Paralympics. He won one medal: the silver medal in the men's 100 metre butterfly S13 event at the 2016 Summer Paralympics.

He is trained by his father.

References

External links 
 

Living people
Year of birth missing (living people)
Place of birth missing (living people)
Swimmers at the 2012 Summer Paralympics
Swimmers at the 2016 Summer Paralympics
Medalists at the 2016 Summer Paralympics
Paralympic silver medalists for Uzbekistan
Uzbekistani male butterfly swimmers
Paralympic swimmers with a vision impairment
Paralympic swimmers of Uzbekistan
Paralympic medalists in swimming
S13-classified Paralympic swimmers
21st-century Uzbekistani people
Uzbekistani blind people